Aino Kapewangolo (born July 23, 1949, in Engela, Ohangwena Region) is a Namibian pastor and politician. Kapewangolo is a SWAPO Party member and pastor of the Evangelical Lutheran Church in Namibia (ELCIN). She served as a member of Parliament in the National Assembly from 2015-2020. She also served as a Deputy Minister of Poverty Eradication and Social Welfare.

Education and career 
Kapewangolo holds a Diploma in Theology from Paulinum Theological Seminary at Otjimbingwe, she enrolled from 1970 to 1973. In 1974–1980, Kapewangolo in her early religion career, worked as a leader of  the ELCIN Women's League, and she was also a member of the Lutheran World Federation of Women in Church and Society from 1986–995. She further served as ELCIN Theologian  from 1973 until 1991. Kapewangolo was appointed to serve as an ordained ELCIN pastor from 1992-2–14. From 2014-2–2015, she was appointed as a special advisor to the governor of Oshikoto Region. Kapewangolo was appointed from 2015 to 2020 as Deputy Minister of Poverty Eradication and Social Welfare.

References 

Namibian Christian theologians
21st-century Namibian politicians
Living people
Members of the National Assembly (Namibia)
Women members of the National Assembly (Namibia)
SWAPO politicians
21st-century Namibian women politicians
People from Ohangwena Region
1949 births